Lars Erik Aronsson (born 19 March 1966 in Örebro, Sweden) is a Swedish programmer and consultant, and the founder of two Swedish web sites: the free electronic book archive Project Runeberg and the Swedish language wiki Susning.nu.

Aronsson was awarded "IP-priset" 2007 for his work with Project Runeberg, Susning.nu and Wikimedia Sverige. He has also attracted attention for his work with OpenStreetMap.

References

External links
Aronsson's home page

Swedish computer specialists
1966 births
Living people